Trochus squarrosus is a species of sea snail, a marine gastropod mollusk in the family Trochidae, the top snails.

Description
The height of an adult shell attains 35 mm, its diameter 40 mm. The thick, umbilicate shell has a conic-pyramidal shape. It is radiate with white and rose color. it contains 9 whorls, the embryonic smooth, the following planulate. The shell is sculptured with spiral series of regular beads the remaining whorls subexcavated in the middle, with three series of granules on the upper part and a series of oblique short folds below. The body whorl is carinated, with 16 to 24 folds crenulating its periphery. The base of the shell is planulate, with six concentric granulose lirae, separated by interstices as wide as the ridges. The aperture rhomboidal and lirate within. The umbilical area spirally plicate.

Distribution
This species occurs in the Indian Ocean off Madagascar.

References

 Dautzenberg, Ph. (1929). Contribution à l'étude de la faune de Madagascar: Mollusca marina testacea. Faune des colonies françaises, III(fasc. 4). Société d'Editions géographiques, maritimes et coloniales: Paris. 321–636, plates IV-VII pp

External links
 

squarrosus
Gastropods described in 1822